Shi Yan may refer to:
 Shi Yan (farmer)
 Shi Yan (footballer)